Lego Legends of Chima Online was a massively multiplayer online role-playing video game based on the Lego Legends of Chima toy line, developed by WB Games Montréal, and published by Warner Bros. Interactive Entertainment; the game was released for Microsoft Windows and OS X on 11 October 2013, and for iOS on 10 March 2014. An Android version of the game was announced, but never released. The game was closed on 1 June 2015, due to a lack of updates causing the game to not generate enough revenue.

Gameplay 
Set within the Chima universe, it was meant to provide children with a "safe and incredibly immersive connected game experience". The player was able to build and customize their kingdom in the world of Chima. Other features included an open world, missions to complete, secret areas to explore, and the ability to build and customize characters and their equipment.

Power Cards 
Power cards were introduced to the game in late February 2014. They gave the player special in-game powers and abilities, or unlocked buildings which gave the player these things. Players scanned the cards with their iOS devices to activate their in-game reward. Power Cards can be found in a number of LEGO Chima sets.

Winterfest 
During Winter 2013, a special event called "Winterfest" was introduced. Around the world, special snowy places appeared. In this event, players could fight bosses, and earn exclusive loot. This was the first of many events in the game.

Spring Break 
During the Spring Half-Term Break, a special event occurred in the game where players could discover special areas, fight Gorilla bosses, and, like the other events, win exclusive loot. Only a few weeks later, the next event, "The Eagle's Challenge", began.

The Eagle's Challenge 
During Spring 2014, a special event called the Eagle's Challenge was released where players had to look for Sugar Pits (Melting Caves) around CHIMA by following a trail of sweets on the ground. Inside the caves, players could battle Eagle bosses and earn exclusive loot. If a player was in a Sugar Pit when the event ended, the player would still be in it, but if the player left the cave after the event, it would disappear, the event being over.

The Outlands 
The Outlands, from Season Two of the TV Series, was launched 15 July 2014. It included new areas, buildings, powers, bosses, weapons & armor, and much of the UI was updated. Income per hour houses changed to have consistent wait times, where previously the time between payouts increased with upgrades. A newspaper was added to display current and upcoming events as well as featured news updates.

References

External links 
 

2013 video games
Cancelled Android (operating system) games
IOS games
Legends of Chima Online
Massively multiplayer online role-playing games
MacOS games
Video games developed in Canada
Warner Bros. video games
Windows games
Inactive massively multiplayer online games
Online
WB Games Montréal games